Kevin Kakela (born August 9, 1960, in Rolla, North Dakota, United States) is an American curler.

At the national level, he is a 1997 United States men's champion curler.

Honours
USA Curling Athlete of the Year: 1997

Teams

Personal life
Kevin Kakela is a farm owner and resides at Hansboro, North Dakota.

His son Kyle is also a curler, he competed at the 2015 Winter Universiade. Kevin and Kyle played some years as teammates.

References

External links

Living people
1960 births
People from Rolette County, North Dakota
Sportspeople from Madison, Wisconsin
Sportspeople from North Dakota
American male curlers
American curling champions